The North Monmouth Library is a small public library serving the village of North Monmouth in Monmouth, Maine.  It is located at 132 North Main Street, in an architecturally distinguished Colonial Revival frame building designed by local architect Harry Cochrane and built in 1927.  It has Palladian windows flanking its main entrance, which is sheltered by a gabled portico.  The building was listed on the National Register of Historic Places in 2017.

See also
National Register of Historic Places listings in Kennebec County, Maine

References

Library buildings completed in 1927
Public libraries in Maine
Libraries on the National Register of Historic Places in Maine
Libraries in Kennebec County, Maine
National Register of Historic Places in Kennebec County, Maine